Cercospora handelii is a fungal plant pathogen.

References

handelii
Fungal plant pathogens and diseases